Gorgodera amplicava is a species of digenetic trematodes whose definitive hosts include amphibians. Its first intermediate host includes the fingernail clam, which is followed by a second intermediate host, which can be a snail, tadpole, or crayfish. Gorgodera is a distome, meaning its body includes two suckers, one oral and one ventral.

Transmission

Symptoms

Diagnosis

Treatment

Life cycle

Morphology

References 

Plagiorchiida
Parasites of amphibians
Parasites of molluscs